Effacer le tableau (literally "erase the board" or "clean the slate") was the operational name given to the systematic extermination of the Bambuti pygmies by rebel forces in the Democratic Republic of the Congo (DRC).

History 
The extermination was carried out by soldiers from the Movement for the Liberation of Congo (MLC), who became known to locals as les effaceurs ("the erasers"), and troops from the Rally for Congolese Democracy (RCD-N).

The primary objective of Effacer le tableau was the territorial conquest of the North Kivu province of the DRC and ethnic cleansing of Pygmies from the Congo's eastern region whose population numbered 90,000 by 2002. The Bambuti were targeted specifically as the rebels considered them "subhuman", and it was believed by the rebels that the flesh of the Bambuti held "magical powers". There were also reports of cannibalism being widespread. It is estimated 60,000 to 70,000 Pygmy were killed in the campaign.

In March 2016, the International Criminal Court found Jean-Pierre Bemba guilty of human rights violations in the Central African Republic. Bemba was the vice president of the DRC, and leader of the MLC during the year-long extermination campaign, but was fully acquitted by the ICC's appeal court in June 2018.

See also
 Outline of genocide studies
 Bibliography of Genocide studies

References

Notes

Bibliography

External links
 Human Rights Watch report on the genocide

African Pygmies
Ethnic groups in the Democratic Republic of the Congo
Genocide of indigenous peoples
Genocides in Africa
Second Congo War
2002 murders in Africa
2003 murders in Africa
2002 in the Democratic Republic of the Congo
2003 in the Democratic Republic of the Congo